Aedes vexans, the inland floodwater mosquito or tomguito, is a cosmopolitan and common pest mosquito.  This species has been collected in southern California.

Description
The adult female has a bandless proboscis, short, brown scales on the scutum, and B-shaped (when viewed from the side) markings on each abdominal tergite. Only the female takes blood meals, preferring humans and cattle.  Males feed on nectar, honeydew, and sap, on which females also feed, although rarely. They are usually found in association with grassy pools, partially shaded woodland pools, roadside ditches, and cultivated fields.

Lifecycle
After taking a blood meal, the female lays her eggs in areas that readily flood, where they hatch when inundated. Larvae are found from April through September and adults from May through October in their central range.

Medical importance
A. vexans is a known vector of Dirofilaria immitis (dog heartworm), myxomatosis (a deadly rabbit viral disease), and Tahyna virus, a seldom-diagnosed Bunyaviridae virus, which affects humans in Europe, causing a fever which disappears after 2 days, but afterward can cause encephalitis or meningitis. A. vexans is the most common mosquito in Europe, often comprising more than 80% the European mosquito community. Its abundance depends upon availability of floodwater pools. In summer, up to 8,000 mosquitoes can be collected per trap per night.  A. vexans exhibited significantly higher transmission rates of Zika virus than A. aegypti, and its wide geographic distribution, periodic extreme abundance, and aggressive human biting behavior increase its potential to serve as a Zika virus vector in northern latitudes outside the range of the primary vectors A. aegypti and A. albopictus. In addition to several medically important viruses Aedes vexans mosquitoes have also been shown to harbour the insect-specific flavivirus Chaoyang virus and insect-specific Aedes vexans Iflavirus.

References

External links
  New Jersey Mosquito Homepage, Characteristics, Bionomics, Medical Importance
  Walter Reed Biosystematics Unit Characteristics, Bionomics, Medical Importance

vexans
Insects described in 1830